The Chairman of the Supreme Soviet of the Uzbek Soviet Socialist Republic (from September 1, 1991: Republic of Uzbekistan) was the presiding officer of that legislature.

Sources

Political history of Uzbekistan
Lists of legislative speakers in the Soviet Union
Uzbek SSR
list